AOL AIM presents: Jason Derülo is the debut concert tour by American recording artist, Jason Derulo (at the time using the ü letter in his stage name). The tour supports his first studio album, Jason Derülo. It was sponsored by AOL's Instant Messenger. The tour stopped in Europe, North America and Australasia.

Opening acts
Auburn (North America, select dates)
Trinity (Australasia)
Morgan Joanel (Australasia, select dates)
Shontelle (Europe—Leg 2)
Mindless Behavior (Europe—Leg 2)
Brian Cade (Fresno)
Super Mash Bros (Lawrenceville)
J. Williams (Auckland)

Setlist
The following setlist is obtained from the September 29, 2010 at the Kneller Auditorium in Worcester, Massachusetts. It does not represents all concerts during the tour. 
"The Sky's the Limit"
"Whatcha Say"
"Love Hangover"
"Instrumental Sequence" (contains elements of "I Gotta Feeling")
"Ridin' Solo"
"In My Head"
"Fallen"
"Blind"
"What If"
"Performance Sequence"
"Billie Jean"
Encore
"Ridin' Solo" / "In My Head" (Reprise)

Tour dates

Festivals and other miscellaneous performances
V Festival
BBC Radio 1Xtra Live
Table Mountain Concert Series
Arizona State Fair
University of Kentucky Homecoming Concert
ChildLine Concert

Cancellations and rescheduled shows

References

2010 concert tours
2011 concert tours
Jason Derulo